The  (National Unity Party), formerly the  (Christian Democracy Party of Quebec), was a social conservative political party in Quebec, Canada. It was founded in 2000 by Roman Catholics associated with the Centre d’Information nationale Robert Rumilly. The founding leader of the party was Gilles Noël. The party's leader since 2010 has been Paul Biron, a retired engineer, whose brother, Rodrigue Biron, was leader of the conservative Union Nationale party from 1976 to 1980.

Its program was a combination of Christian orthodoxy and Quebec nationalism. The party is concerned about the declining birth rate in Quebec, opposed to same-sex marriage and abortion, wants more support for families, and wider availability of Quebec-made consumer products.

The Parti démocratie chrétienne du Québec's 24 candidates won 3,575 votes in the April 2003 general election, or about 0.1% of the popular vote. It proposed to fight the aging of Quebec's population by favouring the family through the creation of a family benefit of $430 per month per child under the age of 18. The party also proposed eliminating the $5/day universal child care program offered by the Government of Quebec at the time.

The party won 1,620 votes in the March 2007 general election, or about 0.04% of the popular vote.

On 29 June 2012 the Chief Electoral Officer of Quebec approved the name of the party to be changed to "Parti Unité Nationale".

Party leaders

 Gilles Noël (2000-2005)
 Michel Bélanger (2005-2006) interim
 Gilles Noël (2006-2007)
 Albert Malcom Tremblay (2007-2010)
 Michel Bélanger (2010)
 Paul Biron (since 21 December 2010)

Election results

Election results

See also

 Politics of Quebec
 List of political parties in Quebec
 National Assembly of Quebec

References

External links
 Website of the Parti unité nationale

Christian democratic parties in North America
Organizations based in Quebec
Lévis, Quebec
Political parties established in 2000
Provincial political parties in Quebec
Right-wing populism in Canada
Conservative parties in Canada
2000 establishments in Quebec
Christian political parties in Quebec